Frenchmen Street is in the 7th Ward of New Orleans, Louisiana.
It is best known for the three-block section in the  Faubourg Marigny  neighborhood which since the 1980s has developed as the center of many popular live-music venues, including Cafe Negril, Favela Chic, Vaso, Apple Barrel,  Blue Nile, Snug Harbor, the Spotted Cat, and the Maison. In addition the street has numerous restaurants, bars, a premier bicycle shop, a record store, a book shop, and other local businesses.

Location
Frenchmen Street runs from the intersection with Esplanade Avenue just inland from the Mississippi River, back to the Gentilly neighborhood.

History 
The oldest and best-known section of Frenchmen Street is in the Faubourg Marigny, now a neighborhood of New Orleans just downriver from the Vieux Carré or  French Quarter. This area was once the plantation of Bernard de Marigny, a wealthy Creole, that is, an ethnic French man born in New Orleans, and political leader. He exemplified the Creoles of his day, with his joie de vivre — a keen enjoyment of living. 

In 1806, Marigny subdivided his property to sell lots and develop a residential area. Many of the remaining houses in this area were built during the nineteenth century and are more than 100 years old; some are much older. Frenchmen Street "was named after six French men who were executed after leading an uprising" after France ceded Louisiana to Spain following its defeat by Great Britain in the Seven Years' War.
 
The Frenchmen Street entertainment district began developing in the 1980s. As Bourbon Street became dominated by tourism, Frenchmen developed as a spot for locals to enjoy live music. The neighborhood attracted venues that were more geared toward authentic New Orleans musical and gastronomical tastes.

Residing on some of the highest ground in the city, Frenchmen Street survived relatively unscathed in 2005 from the widespread destruction of Hurricane Katrina. In the recovery period, the city designated the street as an official arts and entertainment district. It was patronized by both people who came to New Orleans to help rebuild, and by visitors who sought authentic local music.

After the Saints' Super Bowl win in 2010, the street received national news media coverage for hosting one of the largest celebrations in the city's history. Frenchmen Street was also featured on the HBO series Tremé.

Architecture
A walker on Frenchmen Street will notice examples of New Orleans architecture that distinguishes the city from most other historic urban areas. Frenchmen Street is the site of many Creole cottages—a New Orleans design dating to the period between 1790-1850. Creole cottages are single-story, set at ground level, have a steeply pitched roof, symmetrical four-opening façade, and are set close to the front property line. The cottages are usually made of stucco or wood. 

In Malcolm Heard's French Quarter Manual (1997), he quotes nineteenth century architect Benjamin H. Latrobe (1764-1820) describing the cottages: “These one-storied houses are very simple in their plan. The two front rooms open into the street with French glass doors. Those on one side are the dining & drawing rooms, the others, chambers. The front rooms, when inhabited by Americans, are the family rooms, & the back rooms the chambers.” (More English-speaking Americans began to settle in the city following the United States' Louisiana Purchase of 1803.)
	
Frenchmen Street also has a number of examples of the Creole townhouse. This style dates from 1788, following the Great New Orleans Fire. The Creole townhouse is a two- to four-story structure set at or near ground level, with a symmetrical arrangement of arched openings on the façade, set on the property line, featuring an iron balcony at the second and sometimes third levels, and a steeply pitched, side-gabled roof, often with multiple dormers. It usually has a stucco or brick exterior.

See also
List of streets of New Orleans

References

External links

Frenchmen Street Live

Streets in New Orleans
Faubourg Marigny
Entertainment districts in the United States